Events from the year 1761 in Canada.

Incumbents
French Monarch: Louis XV
British and Irish Monarch: George III

Governors
Governor of the Province of Quebec: Jeffery Amherst
Colonial Governor of Louisiana: Louis Billouart
Governor of Nova Scotia: Jonathan Belcher
Commodore-Governor of Newfoundland: Richard Edwards

Events
 Wednesday July 29 – The British terms of peace are so hard that Choiseul declares: "I am as indifferent to peace as Pitt can be. I freely admit the King's desire for peace, and his Majesty may sign such a treaty, but my hand shall never be set to it."
 Tuesday October 6 – King George III offers Pitt the governorship of Canada, with £5,000 per annum, but, instead, makes Pitt's wife, Hester Pitt, Countess of Chatham, a peeress; and £13,000 per annum is granted to the survivor of three of his family.
 Canada under Martial law.

Births
 August 1 : Pierre-Louis Panet, notary and politician

Deaths

 November 15
 Louis-Joseph Gaultier de La Vérendrye, French Canadian fur trader and explorer (born 1717)
 Louis de la Corne, Chevalier de la Corne, explorer (born 1703)

Historical documents
French court accuses British of starting war over borders of Acadia and Canada (with conflict extending to fighting on four continents)

Britain refuses to cede Cape Breton to France (even with pledge of no fortifications), but agrees conditionally to allow French fishing

French policy on ceding American possessions to Britain should consider not colony size, but economic and strategic advantages

Populating Canada will only drain other British colonies, which should be consolidated by "becoming more populous, and [thus] compact"

Advice of Waybukcumigut, "chief and captain" of Mississaugas, in essay on improving relations with Indigenous people (Note: "savages" used)

British ordered not to provoke Canadians on their loss, nor their "language, dress, Manners, Customs, or Country," nor their "mistaken Religion"

British map entire St. Lawrence River above L'Isle-aux-Coudres in detail (Indigenous and settler towns and fields, woods and swamps etc.)

Prints depict damaged and destroyed buildings in Quebec City

Canada is cold because winds passing over snow are full of "nitrous particles," and there are too few "sulphurous exhalations" as little land is tilled

Nova Scotia Council rejects Gen. Amherst's "recommending the Continuation of the French Accadians" that royal order and provincial assembly forbid

"Extremely necessary that the inhabitants should be assisted by the Acadians" to repair dykes and recover marsh lands in Nova Scotia

Commodore Lord Colville reports that Acadians of "Bays of Vert, Miramichi, Chaleurs and Gaspey" have surrendered and their vessels are destroyed

Trader's work in Chaleur Bay ends when Acadians expelled, who (like Mi'kmaq) take him to Chignecto after his ship deserts him (Note: "savages" used)

Vessels arriving at Halifax with "any Plague, Small-Pox, Malignant Fever, or other contagious Distemper" must quarantine two miles below town

With clearing of land in Nova Scotia comes risk of forest fire, and grand juries at county quarter sessions are to develop prevention regulations

Economy of French fishery on Newfoundland includes trade with Labrador "Esquameau," whaling, and timber for shipbuilding

Alexander Henry's canoe brigade journey begins at Sainte-Anne, where his men go to confession and later receive 8 gallons of rum each

Warned repeatedly that, being English, he would be killed at Michilimackinac, Henry dons voyageurs clothing and wields paddle when anyone passes

Voyageurs eat mashed maize on canoe trips, but for over-wintering, Henry finds high grain and meat prices make him "very industrious in fishing"

References

 
Canada
61